Cercops was one of the oldest Orphic poets. He was called a Pythagorean by Clement of Alexandria, which might have meant a Neopythagorean. Cicero, was said by Epigenes of Alexandria to have been the author of an Orphic epic poem entitled the "Descent to Hades", which seems to have been extant in the Alexandrian period. Others attribute this work to Prodicus of Samos, or Herodicus of Perinthus, or Orpheus of Camarina.

Epigenes also assigns to Cercops the Orphic  which was ascribed by some to Theognetus of Thessaly, and was a poem in twenty-four books.

The book The works of Aristotle (1908, p. 80 Fragments) mentioned.
Aristotle says the poet Orpheus never existed; the Pythagoreans ascribe this Orphic poem to a certain Cercon (which likely means Cercops).

Notes

References
 

Ancient Greek poets
6th-century BC poets
Pythagoreans
Underworld in classical literature
6th-century BC religious leaders